The National Highways Development Project (NHDP) is a project to upgrade, rehabilitate and widen major highways in India to a higher standard. The project was started in 1998 under the leadership of Prime Minister, Atal Bihari Vajpayee. National Highways account for only about 2% of the total length of roads, but carry about 40% of the total traffic across the length and breadth of the country. This project is managed by the National Highways Authority of India (NHAI) under the Ministry of Road, Transport and Highways.  The NHDP represents 49,260 km of roads and highways work and construction in order to boost economic development of the country. The government has planned to end the NHDP program in early 2018 and subsume the ongoing projects under a larger Bharatmala project.

Project Phases
The project is composed of the following phases:

 Phase I: The Golden Quadrilateral (GQ; 5,846 km) connecting the four major cities of Delhi, Mumbai, Chennai and Kolkata. Total cost of the project is Rs.300 billion (US$6.8 billion), funded largely by the government’s special petroleum product tax revenues and government borrowing. In January 2012, India announced the four-lane GQ highway network as complete.
 Phase II: North-South and East-West corridors comprising national highways connecting four extreme points of the country. The North–South and East–West Corridor (NS-EW; 7,142 km) connecting Srinagar in the north to Kanyakumari in the south, including spur from Salem to Kanyakumari (Via Coimbatore and Kochi) and Silchar in the east to Porbandar in the west. As of 31 October 2016, 90.99% of the project had been completed, 5.47% of the project work is under Implementation and 3.52% of the total length is left. It also includes Port connectivity and other projects — . The final completion date to 28 February 2009 at a cost of Rs.350 billion (US$8 billion), with funding similar to Phase I.
 Phase III: The government on 12 April 2007 approved NHDP-III to upgrade of national highways on a Build, Operate and Transfer (BOT) basis, which takes into account high-density traffic, connectivity of state capitals via NHDP Phase I and II, and connectivity to centres of economic importance.
 Phase IV: The government on 18 June 2008 approved widening  of highway that were not part of Phase I, II, or III. Phase IV will convert existing single-lane highways into two lanes with paved shoulders. 
 Phase V: As road traffic increases over time, a number of four-lane highways will need to be upgraded/expanded to six lanes.
 Phase VI: The government is working on constructing  expressways that would connect major commercial and industrial townships. It has already identified  of Vadodara (earlier Baroda)-Mumbai section that would connect to the existing Vadodara (earlier Baroda)-Ahmedabad section. The World Bank is studying this project. The project will be funded on BOT basis. The  Expressway between Chennai—Bangalore and  Expressway between Kolkata—Dhanbad has been identified and feasibility study and DPR contract has been awarded by NHAI.
 Phase VII: This phase calls for improvements to city road networks by adding ring roads to enable easier connectivity with national highways to important cities. In addition, improvements will be made to stretches of national highways that require additional flyovers and bypasses given population and housing growth along the highways and increasing traffic. The government has planned to invest Rs. 16,680 Cr for this phase.

Note: 1 crore= 10 million

Status from NHAI website 
National Highways Development Project is being implemented in all phases. The present phases are improving more than 49,260 km of arterial routes of NH network to international standards. The project-wise details of NHDP all phases is below as of 18 May 2021:

Subsummation in Bharatmala project 
National Highway Development Project will close by first half of 2018, with the launch of Bharatmala project. 10,000 km of highway construction left under NHDP will be merged with Phase I of the Bharatmala.

See also

 Similar rail development
 Future of rail transport in India, rail development

 Similar roads development
 Bharatmala
 Diamond Quadrilateral, Subsumed in Bharatmala
 Golden Quadrilateral, completed national road development connectivity older scheme
 North-South and East-West Corridor, Subsumed in Bharatmala
 India-China Border Roads, Subsumed in Bharatmala
 Expressways of India
 Setu Bharatam, river road bridge development in India

 Similar ports and river transport development
 Indian Rivers Inter-link
 List of National Waterways in India
 Sagar Mala project, national water port development connectivity scheme

 Similar air transport development
 Indian Human Spaceflight Programme
 UDAN, national airport development connectivity scheme

 Highways in India
 List of National Highways in India by highway number
 List of National Highways in India

 General
 Transport in India

References

External links
 "Rs. 3.2 trillion for infrastructure in 11th plan" - India e-News article, dated 6 July 2006.
 NHAI Project Photographs
 India Highways Group with many pictures
 'Mile by Mile, India Paves a Smoother Future' — extremely detailed New York Times article, dated 4 December 2005 (free registration required)
 National Highways Development Project: Get The Facts 2014
NHAI list Rs.30bn masala bond on Singapore Exchange (SGX) to boost infrastructure development fund

Roads in India
Deveolpment Project-NHDP
Proposed road infrastructure in India
Ministry of Road Transport and Highways